Mather Byles DesBrisay (March 19, 1828 – April 8, 1900) was a Canadian lawyer, judge, politician, and historian in the Province of Nova Scotia whose collections form the DesBrisay Museum in Bridgewater, Nova Scotia.

A descendant of Captain Théophile de la Cour DesBrisay (1671–1761) whose Huguenot family fled religious persecution in France and settled in Dublin, Ireland before emigrating to Canada, Mather Byles DesBrisay was the great-great-grandson of Thomas DesBrisay, a Lieutenant-Governor of St. John's Island (now Prince Edward Island). He was born in Chester, Nova Scotia and was educated in Halifax and Dartmouth. Trained in law, in 1851 Mather DesBrisay was admitted to the Bar of Nova Scotia. He eventually set up a law practice in his native Chester but in 1865 made Bridgewater his home.

In 1867, DesBrisay entered provincial politics as part of the anti Confederation movement and in the Nova Scotia general election was voted to the Nova Scotia House of Assembly. Reelected in 1874, the following year he was named Speaker of the House of Assembly of Nova Scotia. After 1875 DesBrisay was out of politics and in 1876 he married Ada Adams Harley.

Mather DesBrisay served as a County Court judge for Lunenburg, Shelburne and Queens counties until 1897. An avid historian, in 1870 he published his book titled "History of the County of Lunenburg." It marked what became a major pursuit of documentation that saw a revised edition of his book published in 1895. Following his death in 1900, the town of Bridgewater acquired his vast collection of papers and artifacts and established the DesBrisay Museum as a public community history museum.

Mather and Ada DesBrisay are buried together in the Brookside Cemetery in Bridgewater.

References

External links
 Canadian Biographer
History of the County of Lunenburg, Google Books

1828 births
1900 deaths
Lawyers in Nova Scotia
Judges in Nova Scotia
Nova Scotia Anti-Confederation Party MLAs
Speakers of the Nova Scotia House of Assembly
People from Lunenburg County, Nova Scotia
Mather Byles